Gödet Dam is a dam in Turkey. The development was backed by the Turkish State Hydraulic Works.

See also
List of dams and reservoirs in Turkey

References
DSI directory , State Hydraulic Works (Turkey), Retrieved December 16, 2009

Dams in Karaman Province